Terrence Jesse Evans (October 4, 1911 – May 4, 1999) was a Canadian freestyle sport wrestler who competed in the 1936 Summer Olympics.

He was born in Ashton upon Mersey, United Kingdom of Great Britain and Ireland.

In 1936 he competed in the freestyle middleweight tournament.

At the 1934 Empire Games he won the gold medal in the freestyle middleweight class. Four years later he won again the gold medal in the freestyle middleweight competition at the 1938 Empire Games. He later moved to North Bay, Ontario where he founded the North Bay Canoe Club in 1968, along with his wife Jean. He died there in 1999.

References

External links
 

1911 births
1999 deaths
Canadian male sport wrestlers
Commonwealth Games gold medallists for Canada
Commonwealth Games medallists in wrestling
English emigrants to Canada
Olympic wrestlers of Canada
People from Sale, Greater Manchester
Sportspeople from Greater Manchester
Wrestlers at the 1934 British Empire Games
Wrestlers at the 1936 Summer Olympics
Wrestlers at the 1938 British Empire Games
20th-century Canadian people
Medallists at the 1934 British Empire Games
Medallists at the 1938 British Empire Games